Koskue is a village in Jalasjärvi, Southern Ostrobothnia, Finland. In 2007 it had a population of 850.

References

External links 

 Official website of Koskue

Villages in Finland
Kurikka